Eagle Rare is a brand of bourbon whiskey distilled and distributed by the Buffalo Trace Distillery. Eagle Rare is 90 proof bourbon, aged for either 10 or 17 years, depending on the variety. It was introduced in 1975 and is distilled in Frankfort, Kentucky.

History
Eagle Rare was originally a 101-proof ten-year-old (not single-barrel) Kentucky straight bourbon whiskey from Seagram created by master distiller Charles L. Beam.  Introduced in 1975, Eagle Rare was among the last new bourbon brands introduced prior to the current era of 'small-batch bourbons'.  Eagle Rare has been distilled, bottled and/or marketed by a number of companies, including the Old Prentice Distillery of Frankfort, KY.

The Sazerac Company, an American family-owned producer and importer based in New Orleans, Louisiana, and the parent company of five distilleries, acquired Eagle Rare from Seagram in March 1989. Sazerac's Kentucky distillery was then known as the George T. Stagg Distillery. Today the distillery is known as the Buffalo Trace Distillery.

The original 101-proof ten-year-old non-single-barrel bourbon has been discontinued as of March 2005.

Current brand expressions
Currently, two basic varieties of Eagle Rare are produced.  The first is aged for ten years (in charred new oak barrels, as with all bourbons), and bottled at 90 U.S. proof.  

The second variety, first offered in 2000, is aged seventeen years and is called part of an "Antique Collection". From 2000 to 2017 it was originally bottled at 90 proof, like the ten year offering. Starting with the 2018 release, it has been released at 101 proof.

In 2021, a 20-year-old limited edition expression of Eagle Rare Bourbon Whiskey at 101 proof was released for $2,000 a bottle.

Awards and reviews
Eagle Rare's 10-year variation has performed well at international spirit ratings competitions.  It received a string of gold and double gold medals from the San Francisco World Spirits Competition between 2005 and 2010 and was given an above-average score of 92 by the Beverage Testing Institute.  In 2013, Eagle Rare Single Barrel Bourbon was awarded the inaugural Bourbon Trophy at the International Wine & Spirits Competition in the United Kingdom. The 17-year expression has performed similarly well. More recently, Eagle Rare Single Barrel Bourbon won a gold medal at the 2014 Los Angeles International Wine & Spirits Competition and a Gold Outstanding medal at the International Wine & Spirits Competition (IWSC – United Kingdom).  Eagle Rare 17 Year Old was awarded a gold medal in the same UK-based competition.  In 2015, Eagle Rare 10 Year was awarded a Gold Outstanding medal by the IWSC, and the 2014 release of the 17-Year-Old expression won a Silver Outstanding medal in the same competition.

Eagle Rare 10 Year won the following awards in 2016:
 Gold Medal; Best Age Statement Bourbon – World Whiskies Awards (Whisky Magazine)
 Gold Medal – San Francisco World Spirits Competition
 Extraordinary/Ultimate Recommendation (95 points); "Great Value" – Ultimate Spirits Challenge
 Gold Medal (92 points) – Los Angeles International Spirits Competition
 Gold Medal – North American Bourbon and Whiskey Competition
 Silver Outstanding Medal – International Wine & Spirits Competition (UK)

Food critic Morgan Murphy rated the brand highly, saying "Without question, the award-winner tastes as rich as it looks."

References

External links
 Eagle Rare Single Barrel official homepage

Bourbon whiskey
Sazerac Company brands